This article lists running mates considered by Ross Perot during his 1996 candidacy for President of the United States. Following his 1992 independent candidacy, which attracted nearly 20% of the popular vote, Perot announced the formation of the Reform Party in 1995. Perot ran for president in 1996, and defeated former Colorado Governor Richard Lamm in the Reform Party primaries. On September 11, 1996, Perot announced his choice of economics professor Pat Choate as his running mate. Perot and Choate had previously co-authored the book Save Your Job, Save Our Country, which argued against the ratification of NAFTA. The Perot–Choate ticket took 8.4% of the popular vote in the 1996 election.

Other speculated candidates

Declined the position
Former Democratic Senator David L. Boren of Oklahoma
Democratic Representative Marcy Kaptur of Ohio
Republican Representative Linda Smith of Washington

Others
Former Colorado Governor Richard Lamm

See also
1996 United States presidential election
Ross Perot 1996 presidential campaign
1996 Reform Party presidential primaries

References

1996
vice presidential selection, 1996